The 2003 King Taco 500 was to have been the nineteenth and final race of the 2003 CART World Series season on November 9, 2003 at the California Speedway in Fontana, California.  However, the event was canceled because of a series of large wildfires in the San Bernardino Mountains north of the speedway.

The wildfire, which was dubbed the Old Fire, started on October 25, was just one of many in the Southern California region at the time.  Because of concerns about the air quality, spectator and driver safety and worries that safety equipment and volunteers needed for the race would be occupied in fighting the fires, the race was initially postponed on October 28.  When attempts to find a date to reschedule the event failed, the race was officially cancelled on October 29. A scheduled NASCAR Winston West Series support race was also cancelled.  Points leader Paul Tracy had already clinched the season championship following the previous race at Surfers Paradise.

References

Fontana
MAVTV 500
Cancelled motorsport events